Joseph A. "Lonny" Bereal is an American R&B singer, songwriter and producer. He is also a member of Flipmode Squad with other rappers such as Busta Rhymes, Spliff Star and Reek da Villian.

Career
Bereal is the cousin of songwriter and producers Charles and Kenneth Bereal. Having started off as a drummer, Bereal got his first break as a background vocalist for John P. Kee, K-Ci & JoJo and Kelly Rowland. He began collaborating as a writer with singer Tank and has since worked as a songwriter and vocal producer with several artists like Chris Brown, Jamie Foxx, Snoop Dogg, Keri Hilson, and Keyshia Cole. In 2007, his credit on Tank's single "Please Don't Go" earned Bereal an ASCAP Award and a Grammy Award nomination. In 2010, he was nominated again for a Grammy Award for Best R&B Song for his contribution on Pleasure P's single "Under".

Bereal became part of the Notifi Music Group, a St. Louis based independent label, in early 2011. His debut album The Love Train includes contributions by Busta Rhymes, Trey Songz, Tank, Chris Brown, and Johnta Austin. The album's first single "Favor", a collaboration with singer Kelly Rowland, was released in May 2011.

Discography

Studio albums

Singles

References

External links
 Official website
 
 

21st-century African-American male singers
American contemporary R&B singers
Living people
Year of birth missing (living people)